Sportsman's Warehouse is an American outdoor sporting goods retailer which operates in 29 states across the United States. Sportsman's Warehouse sells apparel, footwear, and gear which caters to sportsmen and sportswomen with interests in hunting, shooting, reloading, camping, fishing, and other outdoor recreational activities.

Trademark
The Sportsman's Warehouse trademark is "America's Premier Outfitter", which was adopted in 2005.

History
The company emerged from Chapter 11 bankruptcy protection in mid-2009, after filing in March. On December 21, 2020, it was announced that Great American Outdoors Group, the parent company of Bass Pro Shops and Cabela's, would acquire Sportsman's Warehouse. The FTC blocked the merger.

See also
 Academy Sports + Outdoors
 Bass Pro Shops
 Cabela's
 Dick's Sporting Goods
 Gander Mountain
 Legendary Whitetails
 Scheels All Sports

References

External links 
 Sportsman's Warehouse

Companies based in Salt Lake County, Utah
Economy of the Western United States
Economy of the Southeastern United States
Sporting goods retailers of the United States
American companies established in 1986
Retail companies established in 1986
1986 establishments in Utah
Companies that filed for Chapter 11 bankruptcy in 2009
Firearm commerce
Midvale, Utah